"Confidence" is a song recorded by Australian rock group Ocean Alley. It was released on 6 February 2018 as the third single from the group's second studio album, Chiaroscuro (2018). The single was certified platinum in Australia in 2019.

Upon release of the album, Ocean Alley rhythm guitarist Mitch Galbraith said of "Confidence": "We knew we were on to something when we were writing that one, it was different to a lot of our stuff we’d done up to that point. It felt cool for us."

The song was voted number 1 in the Triple J Hottest 100, 2018.

At the ARIA Music Awards of 2019, the song was nominated for Song of the Year. It was also nominated for Rock of the Year at the APRA Music Awards of 2019.

Reception
Esther Triffitt of Amnplify wrote: "'Confidence' oozes an addictive groove, driven by a dragging wah-wah pedal, accompanied by a video packed with the nerves of first-time rollerskating, and the dreaded falls." She added: "With catchy lyrics and a recognisable chorus, 'Confidence' is likely to become a crowd favourite".

Emma Salisbury from The Music said "'Confidence' presents a whomping bass line that intertwines the track's tight marriage of hoarse electric guitar and straight drums, through a laid-back, funky groove. Vocals drenched in harmony echo through a gradual build of synths into perfectly placed hypnotic motifs creating an elaborate, electric soundscape."

Music video 
The song's music video was directed and produced by Tyler Bell and released on 5 February 2018.

Charts

Weekly charts

Year-end charts

Certifications

Release history

References

2018 singles
2018 songs
Ocean Alley songs